The men's 5x5 basketball tournament at the 2018 Asian Games was held in Jakarta, Indonesia from 14 August to 1 September 2018.

Squads

Results
All times are Western Indonesia Time (UTC+07:00)

Preliminary

Group A

Group B

Group C

Group D

Final round

Quarterfinals

Classification 5–8

Semifinals

Classification 7th–8th

Classification 5th–6th

Bronze medal game

Gold medal game

Final standing

References

External links
Basketball at the 2018 Asian Games

Men